On-base plus slugging (OPS) is a sabermetric baseball statistic calculated as the sum of a player's on-base percentage and slugging average. The ability of a player both to get on base and to hit for power, two important offensive skills, are represented.

Below is the list of the top 100 Major League Baseball players in career OPS with at least 3,000 career plate appearances.

Babe Ruth is the all-time leader with a career 1.1636 OPS. Ted Williams (1.1155), Lou Gehrig (1.0798), Oscar Charleston (1.0632), Barry Bonds (1.0512), Jimmie Foxx (1.0376), Turkey Stearnes (1.0340),
Mule Suttles (1.0176), Hank Greenberg (1.0169), Rogers Hornsby (1.0103), and Mike Trout (1.0007) are the only other players with a career OPS over 1.0000.

Key

List
Stats updated as of the end of the 2022 season.

Notes

External links

On-base
Major League Baseball statistics